The Facebookmoord ("Facebook murder") is a term coined by Dutch media for the 2012 murder of Joyce (Winsie) Hau, by the then 14–year-old Jinhua K. from Capelle aan den IJssel, in the Netherlands. Hau's father was also injured during the attack. The case was given its name because the motive lay in a disagreement on Facebook.

Events  
Friends Polly W. (16 years of age) and Hau (15 years of age) had argued during a party, leading Hau to make remarks on Facebook over supposed promiscuous behaviour by Polly. Polly W. then asked her friend Wesley C. (17 years of age) to deal with the situation. C. hired Jinhua K. to 'punish' Hau.

On 14 January 2012, Jinhua K. went to Hau's house, carrying a knife. He rang the doorbell and stabbed Hau repeatedly as she opened the door. Hau's father came running and tried to help and was injured in the struggle. Hau died of her injuries in hospital several days later.

Verdict  
Jinhua K. was sentenced to a year in juvenile detention and three years in justicial involuntary commitment, of which one year was conditional.

Those who ordered the killing, Wesley C. and Polly K. were both convicted to the maximum sentence possible under Dutch criminal law for juveniles, of two years in juvenile detention and justicial involuntary commitment, for conspiring to commit and purposely contributing to the murder. The public prosecutor asked to have the two tried as adults due to the severity of the case, and demanded five years in prison and justicial involuntary commitment, but the court ruled against this.

The prosecution appealed the verdict. The appeal was during a non-public case in July and August 2013. On 27 August 2013 the court of appeals upheld the earlier ruling.

References

Murder in the Netherlands
2012 murders in the Netherlands